Tang Pingyang (born 19 January 1996) is a Chinese badminton player.

Achievements

BWF World Junior Championships
Girls' Doubles

Asia Junior Championships
Girls' Doubles

BWF International Challenge/Series 
Women's doubles

Mixed doubles

  BWF International Challenge tournament
  BWF International Series tournament
  BWF Future Series tournament

References

External links
 

Living people
1996 births
Sportspeople from Nantong
Badminton players from Jiangsu
Chinese female badminton players